Thomas Barry (18 February 1903 – 25 April 1984) was an Irish sportsperson. He played hurling with his local club Carrigtwohill and with the Cork senior inter-county team in the 1920s and 1930s.

Playing career

Club
Barry played his club hurling with his local club in Carrigtwohill club and enjoyed some success.  In spite of this he never won a senior county title with the club.

Inter-county
Barry first came to prominence on the inter-county scene with Cork in the late 1920s. He made his debut in 1928 as Cork faced Clare in the Munster final for the second year in-a-row.  That game ended in a draw, however, in the replay Cork triumphed with Barry collecting his first Munster title.  Cork later defeated Dublin in the All-Ireland semi-final before lining out against Galway in the championship decider.  Galway got a bye into the final without picking up a hurley, however, the game turned into a rout.  A score line of 6-12 to 1-0 gave Cork the victory and gave Barry an All-Ireland medal.

In 1929 Cork retained their provincial dominance for a fourth consecutive year.  A 4-6 to 2-3 defeat of Waterford gave Barry his second Munster title.  The subsequent All-Ireland final was a replay of the previous year's game as Cork played Galway once again.  Mick Ahern scored a goal for Cork after just 25 seconds to start another rout.  Cork won the day by 4-9 to 1-3 giving Barry his second All-Ireland title.

In 1930 Barry added a National Hurling League title to his collection; however, Cork surrendered their provincial crown later that summer.  The team bounced back in 1931 with Barry collecting a third Munster winners’ medal.  Once again it took a replay for Cork and Waterford to be separated.  The All-Ireland final saw Cork take on Kilkenny for the first time since 1926. After a close game both sides finished level – 1-6 apiece.  Eudie Coughlan played a captain's role in that game  as he scored a point from his knees to level the scores.  The replay of the final took place four weeks later and is regarded as a classic.  Cork took the lead at half-time, however, Kilkenny fought back.  Once again both sides finished level – 2-5 apiece.  After this game officials pressed for extra time, however, this was rejected.  It was also suggested at a meeting of the GAA’s Central Council that both counties be declared joint champions and that half an All-Ireland medal by given to each player.  This motion was later defeated.  The first week of November saw the second replay of the All-Ireland final take place.  At the third attempt Cork triumphed by 5-8 to 3-4 giving Barry his third and final All-Ireland medal.

References
 Corry, Eoghan, The GAA Book of Lists (Hodder Headline Ireland, 2005).

External links
 Munster final winning teams
 Cork GAA honours

Carrigtwohill hurlers
Cork inter-county hurlers
1903 births
1984 deaths